Nigeria Polytechnic Games Association, often stylized as NIPOGA Games is a biennial sporting competition involving all accredited polytechnics and colleges of technology in Nigeria. In 2017, the Minister for Sports, Solomon Dalung, was accorded as patron for the games, which saw 81 polytechnics participating in it. According to the organizers, the games were created to ensure peaceful co-existence among Nigerians and to discover and nurture sporting talents for national assignments. Yaba College of Technology are the most successful institution in the competition, having won the most gold medals on seven occasions, the latest being in 2014.

Winners by medals table  
The number of gold medals won in the competition are written in parenthesis.

References

External links 

Sports competitions in Nigeria
Biennial sporting events